Frank Stanley Strobridge (February 17, 1857 – July 22, 1918) was an American politician and insurance businessman from Maryland. He served in the Maryland Senate from 1896 to 1900.

Early life
Frank Stanley Strobridge was born on February 17, 1857, in San Francisco, California, to Rhoda Warren (née Davol) (born 1830) and Jerome M. Strobridge. He attended public and private schools in Philadelphia, Pennsylvania. He moved to Baltimore, Maryland, with his parents in 1875.

Career
After moving to Baltimore, Strobridge worked at an insurance office. He was the incorporator of Baltimore Mutual Aid Society in 1881. Strobridge organized and incorporated the Baltimore Life Insurance Company on March 27, 1882. He then served as the first president until his death.

Strobridge was a Republican. Strobridge served in the Maryland Senate, representing the 3rd legislative district of the City of Baltimore, from 1896 to 1900.

Strobridge was president of the 12th Ward's Republican Club. He was also governor of the Young Men's Republican Club and served as a member of the Republican State Central Committee.

Personal life
Strobridge married Alice Barnes (born 1864) in 1883. They hade five children, including Frank Stanley Jr. (born 1884), J. Howard (born 1886), Elsie and  Alice (born 1889).

Strobridge died on July 22, 1918, at his summer cottage at 415 Lake Avenue in Asbury Park, New Jersey. He was buried at Loudon Park Cemetery in Baltimore.

References

External links

Maryland State Archives: Frank S. Strobridge

1857 births
1918 deaths
Politicians from San Francisco
Politicians from Philadelphia
Politicians from Baltimore
Republican Party Maryland state senators
American businesspeople in insurance